Biathlon at the 2014 Winter Olympics was held at the Laura Biathlon & Ski Complex near Krasnaya Polyana, Russia. The eleven events took place between 8–22 February 2014.

For the first time ever, a mixed relay event was staged after being voted onto the Olympic program in 2011.

Competition schedule 
The following is the competition schedule for all eleven events.

All times are (UTC+4).

Medal summary 
Notably absent from the medals for biathlon in the 2014 Games were the German women who had won six medals in 2006 and five in 2010. The men's team meanwhile recovered from a poor Games in Vancouver to achieve two silver medals. France's women, who had won three medals in 2010, also missed the podium, as did Canada, despite some promising performances. Sweden's men were also expected to win a medal but they too missed out.

13 athletes went home with two or more medals with five athletes winning three medals each. Belarus's Darya Domracheva won three gold medals to be the most successful biathlete at the Games, while France's Martin Fourcade was the most successful male winning two gold and one silver medal. 2012/13 women's World Cup winner Tora Berger won a medal of each color, while team-mate Tiril Eckhoff won one gold and two bronze at her first Games. Czech athlete Ondřej Moravec won two silver and one bronze.

The biathlon portion was marred by German biathlete Evi Sachenbacher-Stehle's positive doping test. Sachenbacher-Stehle had finished fourth in both the mass start and the mixed relay but was disqualified from both events after testing positive for the banned substance methylhexanamine.

On 27 November 2017, Olga Vilukhina and Yana Romanova (both from Russia) were disqualified for doping violations. On 1 December 2017, their teammate Olga Zaitseva was also disqualified. On 24 September 2020, the Court of Arbitration for Sport removed the sanctions from Olga Vilukhina and Yana Romanova, but upheld them on their teammate Olga Zaitseva. Medals in the women's relay were redistributed by the IOC on 19 May 2022.

On 15 February 2020, it was announced that because of a doping violation Evgeny Ustyugov and Russian relay team had been disqualified from the 2014 Olympics. There is no official decision by the IOC yet.

Medal table

Men's events

Women's events

Mixed event

Participating NOCs
Thirty-five nations sent biathletes to compete in the events.

Qualification 

A total quota of 220 athletes were allowed to compete at the Games (113 men and 107 women). Countries were assigned quotas using a combination of the Nation Cup scores of their top 3 athletes in the individual sprint and relay competitions at the 2012 and 2013 World Championships.

References

External links
Official Results Book – Biathlon

 
2014
Biathlon
Winter Olympics
Biathlon competitions in Russia